Michael Edwin Keefe (April 14, 1844 – June 28, 1933) was a building contractor and political figure in Nova Scotia, Canada. He represented Halifax County in the Nova Scotia House of Assembly from 1900 to 1906.

He was born in Halifax, the son of John Keefe, of Irish descent. Keefe served as mayor of Halifax from 1892 to 1895. He ran unsuccessfully for a seat in the House of Commons in 1896. He was first elected to the provincial assembly in a 1900 by-election and reelected in the general election which followed. He died in Halifax in 1933.

References 
 Canadian Parliamentary Guide, 1905, AJ Magurn

1844 births
1933 deaths
Nova Scotia Liberal Party MLAs
Mayors of Halifax, Nova Scotia